Donald Glover is an American actor, comedian, screenwriter, producer, director, singer and rapper, also known under the stage name Childish Gambino.

In 2016, Glover received widespread acclaim from critics for the comedy-drama television series Atlanta created by and starring him, for which he won two Golden Globe Awards, including Best Television Series – Musical or Comedy and Best Actor – Television Series Musical or Comedy. For the show's first three seasons, he received nine Primetime Emmy Award nominations that resulted in two wins, Outstanding Lead Actor in a Comedy Series and Outstanding Directing for a Comedy Series, becoming the first African American to win in the latter category. His appearance on Saturday Night Live earned him a nomination for Outstanding Guest Actor in a Comedy Series.

As of 2018, he won five Writers Guild of America Awards for his contribution to the satirical television sitcom 30 Rock and for the first season of Atlanta.

For his music, Glover has received five Grammy Awards. He earned his first win for Best Traditional R&B Performance for the song "Redbone" and won four awards for the single "This is America", including Song of the Year and Record of the Year. At the 2018 edition, he was also nominated in the categories Album of the Year for "Awaken, My Love!" and Record of the Year for "Redbone".

Major awards

Golden Globe Awards

Grammy Awards

Primetime Emmy Awards

Screen Actors Guild Awards

Guild awards

Directors Guild Awards

Producers Guild Awards

Writers Guild Awards

Other awards

AIM Independent Music Awards

American Film Institute Awards

American Music Awards

BET Awards

BET Hip Hop Awards

Billboard Music Awards

Black Reel Awards

Brit Awards

Comedy Awards

Critics' Choice Association Awards

Critics' Choice Television Awards

EWwy Awards

GAFFA Awards (Denmark)

Gotham Independent Film Awards

Hollywood Critics Association TV Awards

iHeartRadio MMVAs

iHeartRadio Music Awards

MTV Europe Music Awards

MTV Movie & TV Awards

MTV Video Music Awards

NAACP Image Awards

NewNowNext Awards

PAAFTJ Television Awards

Peabody Awards

People's Choice Awards

Satellite Awards

Soul Train Music Awards

TCA Awards

Teen Choice Awards

TV Guide Awards

References

External links

Glover, Donald
Gambino, Childish
Glover, Donald
Glover, Donald